Peter Lawrence Nicklas (born July 24, 1939) is a former American football offensive tackle who played one season in the American Football League (AFL) for the Oakland Raiders. He played college football for Baylor.

Early life and education
Nicklas was born on July 24, 1939, in Akron, Ohio. He attended Whittier High School in California, graduating in 1957. He joined Cerritos Junior College following his graduation from high school, blocking a punt in the Junior College Rose Bowl. He was a "star player" for the school in 1958, being named first-team all-conference at the conclusion of the season. After playing the 1959 season with the team, Nicklas transferred to Baylor University.

A 1960 profile in the Austin American-Statesman called Nicklas a player who, "turns in occasional big plays but needs to be consistent." He suffered a broken nose in mid-December which caused him to miss the end of the season. A 1961 article in The Waco News-Tribune wrote, "The Bruin situation is similar to that of the Longhorns: to be a standout contender they need a top-flight first-team tackle combination. The key name probably is Pete Nicklas, who has been erratic at times but also has shown the ability to make the big play. If Nicklas can have a banner year the Bruin front line might be very good, indeed."

Professional career
Though he was selected in the 9th round (119th overall) of the 1961 NFL Draft by the Baltimore Colts, he did not play with them and continued his education. After graduating from Baylor in 1962, he was the 233rd selection in the 1962 AFL Draft by the Oakland Raiders. He officially signed with the team on February 26, 1962. He was the team's backup tackle, and could play on either the right side or left side of the line. He also was occasionally used on defense. Overall, in the 1962 season, he appeared in all fourteen games, and started one. The Raiders finished the season 1–13, and he was traded to the Buffalo Bills in June 1963. He was waived at roster cuts, ending his professional career.

References

1939 births
Living people
Players of American football from Akron, Ohio
American football offensive tackles
Baylor Bears football players
Oakland Raiders players
Buffalo Bills players